The Women's 200 metre individual medley competition of the 2022 FINA World Swimming Championships (25 m) was held on 13 December 2022.

Records
Prior to the competition, the existing world and championship records were as follows.

Results

Heats
The heats were started at 12:32.

Final
The final was held at 20:11.

References

Women's 200 metre individual medley
2022 in women's swimming